The Ajax class of ironclad battleships consisted of two ships,  and , serving in the Victorian era Royal Navy. They were armed with turret-mounted main armament.

Design 
These two ships were built to the same concept as Inflexible - a heavily armoured citadel carrying four heavy guns mounted 'en echelon' in turrets to achieve all-round fire - but were required to be of lighter draught, and to displace 3,000 tons less. It was therefore necessary to arm them with guns of 12.5 inch calibre, as against 16 inch in Inflexible, and to accept a maximum speed of nearly two knots less. Also, unlike the Inflexible, these ships were dependent upon the integrity of their unarmoured ends to maintain buoyancy; should the ends have been damaged enough to become waterlogged, the ships would have sunk.

This class were the last ships in the Royal Navy to be armed with muzzle-loading rifles, and the first to carry any form of secondary armament. They were designed from the start not to carry any form of sailing rig.

Ships

References

Notes

Bibliography 
 Oscar Parkes,  British Battleships  
 Conway,  All the World's Fighting Ships  

Battleship classes
 Ajax-class battleship
Ship classes of the Royal Navy
 Ajax-class battleship